Karl Gehlen was the chief designer of the German Flugzeugbau Friedrichshafen GmbH company, formed on June 17, 1912 by Diplom Ingenieur Theodor Kober, a working associate of Graf Ferdinand von Zeppelin.

External links
 

Members of the Early Birds of Aviation
German aerospace engineers
People from Düsseldorf
Engineers from North Rhine-Westphalia
Year of birth missing
Year of death missing